Edward Michael Hughes (3 September 1940 – 20 December 2018) was a Welsh professional footballer who made 247 appearances in the Football League playing as a midfielder for Cardiff City, Exeter City and Chesterfield. Hughes then became player-manager of Southern League side Yeovil Town, before leaving in 1972 to become a coach at Torquay United. Hughes returned to Yeovil as a caretaker manager in 1983, he also managed Salisbury City and Cirencester Town.

Hughes died in December 2018 at the age of 78.

Family
2 sons ;
Adrian (b 1972)
Robert (b 1975)

References

1940 births
2018 deaths
People from Llanidloes
Sportspeople from Powys
Welsh footballers
Association football midfielders
Cardiff City F.C. players
Exeter City F.C. players
Chesterfield F.C. players
Yeovil Town F.C. players
English Football League players
Welsh football managers
Yeovil Town F.C. managers
Torquay United F.C. non-playing staff
Salisbury City F.C. managers
Shaftesbury Town F.C. managers
Cirencester Town F.C. managers